Eastern Railway or Railroad may refer to:

 Eastern Railway (Western Australia)
 Eastern Railway (Austria), a railway line in Austria, initially operated by Austrian Eastern Railway
 Eastern Railway (India)
 Eastern Railway (Israel)
 Eastern Railway (Turkey), one of the predecessor railways to the Turkish State Railways
 Eastern Railroad, a former railroad company in New England that was a competitor, and later subsidiary, of the Boston and Maine Railroad
 Eastern Railroad (Pennsylvania), leased by the Monongahela Connecting Railroad
 Eastern Railroad of Long Island
 Eastern National Railway (Austria), a former railway company in the Austrian Empire and Austria-Hungary
 Austrian Eastern Railway, a former railway company in the Austrian Empire and Austria-Hungary
 Bavarian Eastern Railway Company, a former railway company in Bavaria, Germany
 Bosnian Eastern Railway, a former network of narrow-gauge railway lines in Bosnia and Herzegovina
 Chinese Eastern Railway, a formerly Russian railway line in China
 Prussian Eastern Railway, a railway line in Prussia, part of the former German Empire
 Württemberg Eastern Railway, a railway line in Württemberg, Germany

See also
 
 Ostbahn (disambiguation)